

Æthelgar was a medieval Bishop of Crediton.

Æthelgar was elected to Crediton in 934. He died in 952 or 953.

Citations

References

External links
 

Bishops of Crediton (ancient)
10th-century English bishops
950s deaths
Year of birth unknown
Year of death uncertain
Place of birth unknown
Place of death unknown